The Karuk people are an indigenous people of California, and the Karuk Tribe is one of the largest tribes in California. Karuks are also enrolled in two other federally recognized tribes, the Cher-Ae Heights Indian Community of the Trinidad Rancheria and the Quartz Valley Indian Community.

Happy Camp, California, is located in the heart of the Karuk Tribe's ancestral territory, which extends along the Klamath River from Bluff Creek (near the community of Orleans in Humboldt County) through Siskiyou County and into Southern Oregon.

Name
The name "Karuk," also spelled "Karok," means "upriver people", or "upstream" people, and are called Chum-ne in Tolowa.

Language
The Karuk people speak the Karuk language, a language isolate. The tribe has an active language revitalization program.

Population
Estimates for the population sizes of most Native groups before European arrival in California have varied substantially.{{efn|For estimates of population, see Population of Native California.}} Alfred L. Kroeber proposed a population for the Karuk of 1,500 in 1770. Sherburne F. Cook initially estimated it as 2,000, later raising this figure to 2,700. In 1910, Kroeber reported the surviving population of the Karuk as 800.

According to the 2010 census, there were 6,115 Karuk individuals, of which 3,431 were full-blooded.

Culture

Since time immemorial, the Karuk resided in villages along the Klamath River, where they continue such cultural traditions as hunting, gathering, fishing, basketmaking and ceremonial dances. The Karuk were the only California tribe to grow tobacco plants. The Brush Dance, Jump Dance and Pikyavish ceremonies last for several days and are practiced to heal and "fix the world," to pray for plentiful acorns, deer and salmon, and to restore social goodwill as well as individual good luck.

In the summers of 1871 and 1872, an amateur ethnographer by the name of Stephen Powers visited Indian groups in Northern California.  His published observations offer an insight into the lives of the native survivors of the California Gold Rush.  According to Powers, the Karok (Karuk) were one of three groups living on the Klamath River (the others being the Yurok and Modoc).  He also noted that there was no recollection of any ancient migration to the region; instead there were legends of Creation and the Flood which were fabled to have occurred on the Klamath.

Some of Powers' other observations were that:

The Karuk developed sophisticated usage of plants and animals for their subsistence. These practices not only consisted of food harvesting from nature, but also the use of plant and animal materials as tools, clothing and pharmaceuticals. The Karuk cultivated a form of tobacco, and used fronds of the Coastal woodfern as anti-microbial agents in the process of preparing eels for food consumption.

Karuk in film
 Andrew Chambers. 2008. Pikyáv (to fix it). Documentary film produced for the Truly California series. KQED Public Television and C. Buried Star Productions.

Notable Karuk people

Rob Cabitto, author of a memoir about his struggles with identity and addiction.
Naomi Lang, figure skater; five time US Champion in ice dancing from 1999 to 2003. As a member of the 2002 US Olympic figure skating team, she was the first Native American woman to compete in the Winter Olympics. Her great-great-grandmother, Bessie Tripp, was a full blooded Karuk from Orleans/Salmon River.
Buck Martinez, former professional baseball player and current play-by-play broadcaster for the Toronto Blue Jays.
Anthony Earl Numkena (Hopi/Karuk) (born 1942), actor, appeared in a number of films and television shows in the 1950s including being credited in Pony Soldier'' (1952) at the age of nine.  His grandmother, Caroline Besoain, née Harrie, was three-quarters Karuk born in Somes Bar, California in 1899 and settled in Quartz Valley, California.
Jetty Rae, musician whose grandmother, Jetty Rae Thom, was a full-blooded Karuk.
Fox Anthony Spears, artist and printmaker who uses geometric designs inspired by Karuk basketry patterns. Commissioned to design warmup jersey patches for Seattle Kraken’s Indigenous Peoples Night game in 2021.

See also
Karuk language
Karuk traditional narratives

Notes

References

Further reading
Karuk Reservation and Off-Reservation Trust Land, California, United States Census Bureau
Karuk Bibliography, from California Indian Library Collections Project

External links
 Karuk Tribe of California
 Ayukii: Karuk, The People of the Klamath
 Karuk Language Section
 Karuk language resources
 

 
Native American tribes in California
Native American tribes in Oregon
Siskiyou County, California